The 1999 Air Canada Cup was Canada's 21st annual national midget 'AAA' hockey championship, played April 19–25, 1999 at the Prince Albert Comuniplex in Prince Albert, Saskatchewan. The Regina Pat Canadians defeated the Calgary AAA Midget Flames in double overtime in the championship game to win the gold medal.  The Gouverneurs de Ste-Foy from Quebec took home the bronze medal in their tenth Air Canada Cup appearance.

Teams

Round robin

Standings

Scores

Ste-Foy 7 - Sault Ste. Marie 1
Calgary 4 - Regina 2
Prince Albert 2 - Cape Breton 1
Regina 9 - Sault Ste. Marie 2
Ste-Foy 9 - Cape Breton 3
Calgary 2 - Prince Albert 1
Regina 10 - Cape Breton 0
Calgary 5 - Sault Ste. Marie 3
Ste_Foy 5 - Prince Albert 2
Cape Breton 5 - Sault Ste. Marie 4
Ste-Foy 4 - Calgary 4
Regina 7 - Prince Albert 2
Calgary 4 - Cape Breton 1
Regina 3 - Ste-Foy 1
Prince Albert 7 - Sault Ste. Marie 4

Playoffs

Semi-finals
Calgary 3 - Prince Albert 1
Regina 3 - Ste-Foy 2 (2OT)

Bronze-medal game
Ste-Foy 6 - Prince Albert 2

Gold-medal game
Regina 5 - Calgary 4 (2OT)

Individual awards
Most Valuable Player: Curtis Markewich (Regina)
Top Scorer: Curtis Markewich (Regina)
Top Forward: Jean-Phillippe Briere (Ste-Foy)
Top Defenceman: Jean-Philippe Côté (Ste-Foy)
Top Goaltender: Paul Valaitis (Regina)
Most Sportsmanlike Player: David Borrelli (Sault Ste. Marie)

Regional Playdowns

Atlantic Region 
The Cape Breton Jeans Experts advanced by winning their regional tournament, which was played April 1–4, 1999 in Dartmouth, Nova Scotia.

Quebec 
The Gouverneurs de Ste-Foy advanced by capturing the Quebec Midget AAA League title.

Central Region 
The Sault Ste. Marie North Stars advanced by winning their regional tournament, which was played April 6–11, 1999 in Belleville, Ontario.

West Region 
The Regina Pat Canadians advanced by winning their regional tournament, which was played April 8–11, 1999 in Saskatoon, Saskatchewan.

Pacific Region 
The Calgary AAA Midget Flames advanced by winning their regional tournament, which was played April 9–11, 1999 in Calgary, Alberta.

See also
Telus Cup

References

External links
1999 Air Canada Cup Home Page
Hockey Canada-Telus Cup Guide and Record Book

Telus Cup
Air Canada Cup
Sport in Prince Albert, Saskatchewan
Ice hockey competitions in Saskatchewan
April 1999 sports events in Canada